The 2018–19 Biathlon World Cup – Relay Men started on Sunday 16 December 2018 in Hochfilzen and finished on Saturday 16 March 2019 in Östersund. The defending team was Norway.

The winning team was Norway.

Competition format
The relay teams consist of four biathletes. For every round of five targets there are eight bullets available, though the last three can only be single-loaded manually from the spare round holders or from bullets deposited by the athlete into trays or onto the mat at the firing line. If after eight bullets there are still standing targets, one  penalty loop must be taken for each remaining target. The first-leg participants start all at the same time, and as in cross-country skiing relays, every athlete of a team must touch the team's next-leg participant to perform a valid changeover. On the first shooting stage of the first leg, the participant must shoot in the lane corresponding to their bib number (bib #10 shoots at lane #10 regardless of their position in the race), then for the remainder of the relay, the athletes shoot at the lane corresponding to the position they arrived (arrive at the range in 5th place, shoot at lane five).

2017–18 Top 3 standings

Medal winners

Standings

References

Relay Men